Xiong Qingquan (16 December 1927 – 20 June 2022) was a politician of the People's Republic of China.

Biography 
He was born in Shuangfeng County, Loudi, Hunan. He was Chinese Communist Party Committee Secretary (1988–1993) and governor (1985–1989) of his home province. He was a delegate to the 7th National People's Congress (1988–1993). He died from an illness in Changsha, Hunan, at the age of 94.

References

Bibliography 
 

1927 births
2022 deaths
People's Republic of China politicians from Hunan
Chinese Communist Party politicians from Hunan
Governors of Hunan
Delegates to the 7th National People's Congress
Mayors of Changsha
People from Shuangfeng County
Hunan Normal University alumni
Politicians from Loudi